"Rock-a-bye baby in the tree top" (sometimes "Hush-a-bye baby in the tree top") is a nursery rhyme and lullaby. It has a Roud Folk Song Index number of 2768.

Words

First publication 
The rhyme is believed to have first appeared in print in Mother Goose's Melody (London c. 1765), possibly published by John Newbery, and which was reprinted in Boston in 1785. No copies of the first edition are extant, but a 1791 edition has the following words:

The rhyme is followed by a note: "This may serve as a warning to the proud and ambitious, who climb so high that they generally fall at last."

Modern versions 
Modern versions often alter the opening words to "Rock-a-bye", a phrase that was first recorded in Benjamin Tabart's Songs for the Nursery (London, 1805).

A 2021 National Literacy Trust example has these words:

Origin
The scholars Iona and Peter Opie note that the age of the words is uncertain, and that "imaginations have been stretched to give the rhyme significance". They list a variety of claims that have been made, without endorsing any of them:

 that the baby represents the Egyptian deity Horus
 that the first line is a corruption of the French "He bas! là le loup!" (Hush! There's the wolf!)
 that it was written by an English Mayflower colonist who observed the way Native American women rocked their babies in birch-bark cradles, suspended from the branches of trees 
 that it lampoons the British royal line in the time of James II.

In Derbyshire, England, one local legend has it that the song relates to a local character in the late 18th century, Betty Kenny (Kate Kenyon), who lived in a huge yew tree in Shining Cliff Woods in the Derwent Valley, where a hollowed-out bough served as a cradle.

Tunes

The rhyme is generally sung to one of two tunes. The only one mentioned by the Opies in The Oxford Book of Nursery Rhymes (1951) is a variant of Henry Purcell's 1686 quickstep Lillibullero, but a second is popular in the USA.

In 1887 The Times carried an advertisement for a performance in London by a minstrel group featuring a "new" American song called 'Rock-a-bye': "Moore and Burgess Minstrels, St James's-hall TODAY at 3, TONIGHT at 8, when the following new and charming songs will be sung...The great American song of ROCK-A-BYE..." An article in The New York Times of August 1891 referred to the tune being played in a parade in Asbury Park, N.J. Newspapers of the period credited its composition to two separate persons, both resident in Boston: Effie Canning (later referred to as Mrs. Effie D. Canning Carlton, and Charles Dupee Blake.

See also

 
 Rock-a-Bye Lady by Eugene Field

References

Lullabies
English children's songs
English folk songs
Traditional children's songs
English nursery rhymes
Songs about children